Gökhan Kardeş (born 15 May 1997) is a Belgian-born Turkish professional footballer who plays as a defender for Turkish TFF Second League club Esenler Erokspor on loan from Boluspor.

Career
Kardes made his professional debut as Jong PSV player in the second division on 8 August 2016 against FC Den Bosch.

References

External links
 
 
 
 

1997 births
Belgian people of Turkish descent
People from Heusden-Zolder
Footballers from Limburg (Belgium)
Living people
Belgian footballers
Belgium youth international footballers
Turkish footballers
Turkey youth international footballers
Association football defenders
PSV Eindhoven players
Jong PSV players
ASC Daco-Getica București players
K Beerschot VA players
Büyükşehir Belediye Erzurumspor footballers
Boluspor footballers
Eredivisie players
Eerste Divisie players
Liga I players
Challenger Pro League players
TFF First League players
Süper Lig players
TFF Second League players
Belgian expatriate footballers
Turkish expatriate footballers
Expatriate footballers in the Netherlands
Belgian expatriate sportspeople in the Netherlands
Turkish expatriate sportspeople in the Netherlands
Expatriate footballers in Romania
Belgian expatriate sportspeople in Romania
Turkish expatriate sportspeople in Romania